|}

The Like A Butterfly Novice Chase is a Grade 3 National Hunt novice chase in Ireland which is open to horses aged four years or older. 
It is run at Tipperary over a distance of about 2 miles and 4 furlongs (4,023 metres), and it is scheduled to take place each year in October.

The race was first run in 1997 and was awarded Grade 3 status in 2003.

In line with several races at Tipperary, the race is named after a horse owned by J. P. McManus, his Irish Champion Hurdle winning mare, Like-A-Butterfly.  The race was previously named after another J. P. McManus owned horse, Grimes.

The race was sponsored for many years by the company owned by J. P. McManus's younger brother, Kevin McManus Bookmakers.

Records
Leading jockey  (6 wins):
 Ruby Walsh – Doesheknow (2002), Mirpour (2004), Indevan (2014), The Game Changer (2015), Westerner Lady (2016), Rathvinden (2017)

Leading trainer  (6 wins):
 Willie Mullins – 	Its Time For A Win (1999), Indevan (2014), Westerner Lady (2016), Rathvinden (2017), Robin De Carlow (2019), Authorized Art (2022)

Winners

See also
 Horse racing in Ireland
 List of Irish National Hunt races

References
Racing Post:

National Hunt chases
National Hunt races in Ireland
Tipperary Racecourse
Recurring sporting events established in 1997
1997 establishments in Ireland